The R. Williams Jones Cup Team is one of the teams under the auspices of the USA Basketball organization. The R. William Jones Cup competition is an international basketball tournament for men's and women's teams held in Taipei, Taiwan almost annually since the inaugural event in 1977. The event is named after Renato William Jones, the founding secretary-general of FIBA, the International Basketball Federation. USA Basketball organized the USA Women's team entry from the time of the inaugural event through the year 2000. In most years, the team was selected from university and high school all stars. In some years, the team was predominantly selected from one university or conference. For example, the 1990 entry was predominantly the North Carolina State team, plus four other players. The 1991 team was composed of all-star players from the Pac-10 Conference.

Record

Year by year results

1979
Head coach: Pat Summitt (at the time, Pat Head). Assistant coach: Betty Jo Crumm.

The USA team had recently completed the World Championship, so were able to bypass the preliminary rounds. They won all six contests and won the gold medal. Four of the USA team member were named to the 12 player all-tournament team:
 Carol Blazejowski
 Tara Heiss
 Nancy Lieberman
 Rosie Walker

1980
Head coach: Cherri Rapp. Assistant coach: C. Vivian Stringer.

The team started out strong, winning their first three games. Then they faced the Republic of China – Blue team, who beat the USA 86–81. They won their next fours games, including a close match against the undefeated Republic of China – White team, which they won 84–82, and a rematch against the Blue team, which they won 66–62. With a 4–0 record in medal round play, they simply had to beat their last opponent, South Korea, who had a 3~1 record, to win the gold. However, South Korea won the game 90–79. The Republic of China – White also won. leaving three teams tied with 4–1 records. The tie-breaker was point differential, and this left the USA team with the bronze medal. The all-tournament team included two members of the USA team:
 Mary Ostrowski
 Valerie Still

1981
Head coach: Linda Sharp. Assistant coach: Aki Hill.

The team won their first four games easily, then faced the Republic of China – Blue team. Although the USA had an early ten-point lead, the Blue team came back to lead by four points at halftime. The USA opened the second half with a 9–2 run to reclaim the lead for good and went on to win the game. They then went on to win their next two games easily, and faced the defending champions South Korea in the final. The game was very close, throughout much of the game, including a tie at 49 points each with about ten minutes to go. The South Koreans then pulled out to a nine-point lead with under two minutes left. The USA team pulled the margin back to three points, but could not close the gap. The South Korean team won, and the USA team received the silver medal. The all-tournament team included three members of the USA team:
 Jackie White
 Joyce Walker
 June Olkowski

1982
Head coach: Marian Washington. Assistant coach: Joan Bonvicini.

The team started out strongly, winning their first four games by 16 or more points. In the fifth game, they were matched against Australia. The game was close until the end. With a half-minute remaining, the USA held a one-point margin. The USA extended the lead to three points on two free throws, the Aussies brought it back to one with two free throws of their own, and the USA hit two free throws with two second left in the game to secure the 65–62 victory. The next two games were easy victories, then the USA based unbeaten Canada in the final game. The game was very close, but the USA fell to Canada 70–67 to finish with a single loss and the silver medal. The all-tournament team included two members of the USA team:
 Lea Henry
 Paula McGee

1983
Head coach: Juliene Simpson. Assistant coach: Lisa Williams.

The 1983 team was composed mainly of members of the Arizona State team, plus two players from California and one from Colorado. The game-by-game results and statistics are not available, although the final standings are known. The USA team finished seventh.

1984
Head coach: Pat Summitt. Assistant coaches: Nancy Darsch and Kay Yow.

The team chosen to represent the USA was the team expected to be selected as the National Team for the Olympics. This resulted in a very strong team which was able to dominate the competition. In the opening game against Australia, the USA won 82–20. While other games were closer, Italy's 23-point loss to the USA was the closest of the eight games. The USA won all eight games, and won the gold medal. The USA team was led by Cheryl Miller, who led the team in scoring at over 15 points per game, rebounding, free throw percentage, assists and steals. The all-tournament team included three members of the USA team:
 Cheryl Miller
 Lynette Woodard
 Denise Curry.

1985
Head coach: Theresa Grentz. Assistant coach: Chris Weller.

The team opened with a lopsided 92–18 victory over the Philippines, then faced Sweden in the second game. The game was close in the first half, and the half ended with the game tied at 31 points each. The USA pulled out to a six-point lead early in the second half but Sweden responded by scoring thirteen consecutive points to take a lead they would not relinquish. The USA team next faced undefeated South Korea. The game was tied again at the half, but this time the USA took a lead in the second half and held on to the lead for the win. They next played undefeated Republic of China and managed to come away with a win by the slimmest of margins, 56–55. After defeating Germany, they had another challenge from Canada, who raced out to a 42–30 lead by halftime. The Canadians still had a twelve-point lead late in the game, but the USA mounted a comeback, and out scored their opponent 18–4 to win the game 65–63. After beating Brazil, they faced Japan in the final game of the competition. Japan was in the lead with five minutes to go in the game, but the USA came back to win with a two-point margin 56–54. The win clinched the championship and the gold medal for the USA team. The all-tournament team included two members of the USA team:
 Suzie McConnell
 Fran Harris

1987
Head coach: Joann Rutherford. Assistant coach: Frankie Porter.

The team started out against Japan, and fell behind at the half. Seven consecutive points to start the second half put the USA team back in the lead, a lead they would not give up, and they went on to win 71–66. The next game against Belgium was also close, with a tie game at halftime, but the USA team managed a three-point victory, 54—51. After easily beating Malaysia, the USA team faced undefeated Republic of China, who kept the game close until halftime. Then the USA went out to a large lead and won 83–74. After beating their next two opponents, the USA team faced an undefeated South Korea. The USA led early but the game was tied at 70 points each with a minute left to go. Tonya Edwards hit two free throws to give the USA a lead, but South Korea hit a three-pointer to take the lead back. Nikita Lowry scored in the final seconds to give the USA team the win, and the gold medal with an overall 7–0 record. The all-tournament team included three members of the USA team:
 Nikita Lowry
 Tonya Edwards
 Edna Campbell

1990
Head coach: Kay Yow. Assistant coaches: Karen Freeman and Que Tucker.

The 1990 team was made up primarily of players from North Carolina State University. In addition, Katie Meier from Duke and Faith Mimnaugh from Loyola were on the team.
The team started out with victories over Malaysia and the Netherlands. In the next game the USA faced the defending Jones cup champions South Korea. The USA team was down by eight points at halftime but close the gap and tied the score up at 76 points late in the game. However South Korea scored the final four points of the game to earn the victory. The USA then went on to lose to Taiwan and Hungary before facing Malaysia again and earning a win. In the final game the USA lost by three points to Japan and ended up with a 3–4 record.

1992
Head coach: Chris Weller. Assistant coaches: Kay James and Marynell Meadors.

The USA team started out with an eight-point win over Japan, then won their next five with double-digit margins. In their game against Australia, they trailed at halftime, but came back to win by ten points. In their next-to-last game, the USA faced South Korea, who gave the USA the toughest challenge yet, but the USA prevailed 91–84. The final game, for the gold medal, was a rematch against Australia. The score was tied late in the first half, but the USA team finished the half with seven straight point, taking a lead they would not give up. The USA completed the competition with an 8–0 record and won the gold medal. Lisa Leslie, at age 19 was playing in her first Jones cup competition. She was the leading scorer and rebounder on the USA team.  Future Georgia Tech Head Coach MaChelle Joseph was the #3 scorer on the team; Joseph was making her second appearance on a USA Women's National Team.

1993
Head coach: Marynell Meadors. Assistant coaches: Evelyn Blalock and Kay James.

The team did not start well, losing the opening game to Japan, and followed that with a three-point loss to Republic of China – Cathay Life. The USA went on to win the next five contests, including a close 74–72 win against Russia, which propelled them to a medal context. That game was a rematch against Russia, and again the results were close. The USA team won 71–69 to win the bronze medal.

1994
Head coach: Sylvia Hatchell. Assistant coaches: Marti Gasser and Jim Lewis.

Despite having four players averaging double-digit scoring, including Wendy Palmer at almost 19 points per game, the USA had some close matches. After winning the opening game, the USA team faced the champions of the prior year, Republic of China – Cathay Life. The game came down to the final seconds, resulting in an 82–81 win. Palmer had 31 points, all needed. In the game against Kazakhstan, the USA was behind by two points at halftime, but came back to win. The USA repeated the feat against Canada, falling behind two points at halftime, but finishing with a win. The USA next faced unbeaten South Korea and came away with a win. Despite not losing a game, the USA needed to beat Republic of China – Nan Ya to advance to the gold medal game, and succeeded, with a 72–64 win. In the final game against South Korea, the teams were tied at the end of regulation and went into overtime. The USA was down with just over a minute to go when Palmer hit a basket to give the USA a one-point lead. After two free throws, South Korea scored, and had the ball on the final possession with a chance to win, but was unable to get up a shot in time. The USA won the gold medal with an 8–0 performance, but with many close games.

1995
Head coach: Lin Dunn. Assistant coaches: Amy Ruley and Trudi Lacey.

The USA team won its first six games, but four of the six were won by single-digit margins. Their seventh game was against Russia, and they fell 100–84. The final game was against South Korea, and a victory would assure the gold medal, but the South Korean team won 80–76 to win the gold medal. The USA team won the bronze medal.

1996
Head coach: Jane Albright-Dieterle. Assistant coaches: Gary Blair and Tori Harrison.

The USA team was dominant, winning their games by an average off 33 points per game. The USA team won their opening seven games, behind the scoring leadership of Sheri Sam, who averaged 13 points per game. In the eighth game, they played undefeated Slovakia, in a game that would determine the gold medal. The USA fell behind; Slovakia had a 22–15 lead. The USA came back, but was still behind at halftime. The game was tied at 45 all, when the USA hit several free throws to take a lead they would not give up. The USA team won he game and the championship 72–62. In the final game, the USA beat South Korea to finish the competition with a perfect 9–3 record.

1997
Head coach: Gail Goestenkors. Assistant coaches: Carolyn Peck and Jody Runge.

The USA team won their first six games. Four of the six were decided by six points or fewer, including the semifinal game against Japan which went to overtime. In the gold medal game, the USA faced undefeated South Korea. The USA team played to a six-point margin early in the second half, but could not extend the margin. South Korea came back, took the lead, and held on to win the championship and the gold medal 76-71.

1998
Head coach: Nell Fortner. Assistant coaches: Angie Lee and Trina Patterson

The opening game was against Republic of China. The USA held a small lead at halftime, jumped out to a larger lead and survived a comeback attempt from China to win the game 62–55. The remaining games would not be close, as the USA team beat South Korea, Senegal and Thailand by 27 points, and beat Japan by 42. The USA finished with a 5–0 record, and won the gold medal.

2000
Head coach: Bonnie Henrickson. Assistant coaches: Stephanie Gaitley and David 'Rusty' Ponton.

The USA team started strong with a 32-point win over the host team, the Republic of China National Team. They then beat South Korea easily and faced Japan in the third game. Japan started out strongly, and had an 18-point lead in the first half. The USA then out scored Japan 23–3 to take a small lead at the half. The USA built a ten-point lead, but Japan cut it back to three with under a minute to go. Kelly Schumacher grabbed an offensive rebound and scored to bring the lead back to five points and the team held on for the win. Schumacher had 24 points to help the USA team beat Japan 83–80. The final game was against Malaysia, but it wasn't close, with the USA winning 79–24, to secure a 4–0 record for the competition and the gold medal.

Coaches and results
The USA competed in the R. William Jones Cup competition under the auspices of USA Basketball from the inaugural event in 1977 until 2000.

Players
The following players participated on the USA Basketball William Jones Cup teams:

See also
 USA Basketball
 United States women's national basketball team
 United States women's World University Games basketball team

Notes

William Jones Cup team
William Jones Cup